Emerson, Lake and Palmer in Concert (also known as simply In Concert) is a live album by Emerson, Lake & Palmer (ELP), recorded at their 26 August 1977 show at the Olympic Stadium, Montreal, Quebec, Canada which is featured on the album cover. It was released by Atlantic Records in November 1979, following ELP's breakup. It was later re-released and repackaged as Works Live in 1993. Some of the tracks were not from the Montreal concert, but from other concerts during their 1977–1978 tour, such as "Peter Gunn" and "Tiger in a Spotlight".

"Peter Gunn" was nominated for Best Rock Instrumental Performance at the 23rd Annual Grammy Awards.

Content

Similar to most live albums, In Concert showcased fan favourites of previously released material. However, "Peter Gunn", ELP's take on the classic TV theme song, was never released on any of their other albums (a slightly edited version of this live recording was included on the 1980 The Best of Emerson, Lake & Palmer compilation and released as a single in some countries). ELP frequently opened with this song on the Works Volume 2 tour.

The band hired a 70-piece orchestra for some concerts of this tour but eventually had to dismiss the orchestra due to budget constraints that almost bankrupted the group. On the original release, the orchestra performs on "C'est la Vie", "Knife-Edge", Keith Emerson's piano concerto, and "Pictures at an Exhibition". Works Live adds four other songs performed with the orchestra: "Fanfare for the Common Man", "Abaddon's Bolero", "Closer to Believing", and "Tank".

Release
The original release of this album carried no producer credit; however, production and mixing of the album was largely carried out by Keith Emerson.

While Emerson intended to release In Concert as a double LP, the band's imminent dissolution meant ELP's label, Atlantic Records, limited it to a single album. The 1993 re-release of the album, as the double CD Works Live, restored Emerson's original intent to some extent.

Track listing

In Concert

Works Live

Personnel

Band members
Keith Emerson – keyboards, mixing
Greg Lake – vocals, bass, guitars
Carl Palmer – drums, percussion
A 70-piece orchestra on tracks 4, 6, 7 and 8 of In Concert, and tracks 4, 8, 9 of disc one and the entire disc two of Works Live.

Others
Godfrey Salmon – conductor
Michael Leveillee – sound engineer
Neil Preston – inner sleeve photo
Francois Rivard – cover photography
Bob Defrin – art director

Release details
1979, UK, Atlantic/WEA K50652, Release date 17 November 1979, LP
1979, Japan, Atlantic/Warner-Pioneer P-10697A, Release date 21 November 1979, LP
1996, UK, Essential/Castle ESDCD362, Release date ? ? 1996, CD (double release called "Works Live")
1999, Japan, Manticore/Victor KVICP-60644, Release date ? ? 1999, CD

Singles
 Peter Gunn / Knife-Edge
 Peter Gunn / Tiger in a Spotlight (USA release)

Charts

Notes

Albums produced by Greg Lake
In Concert
1979 live albums
Atlantic Records live albums